Max Hürzeler (born 19 September 1950) is a Swiss sports shooter. He competed in the men's 50 metre rifle three positions event at the 1976 Summer Olympics.

References

1950 births
Living people
Swiss male sport shooters
Olympic shooters of Switzerland
Shooters at the 1976 Summer Olympics
Place of birth missing (living people)